Kiangan, officially the Municipality of Kiangan  is a 4th class municipality in the province of Ifugao, Philippines. According to the 2020 census, it has a population of 17,691 people.

Kiangan is the oldest town in the province. It derives its name from Kiyyangan, an ancient village near the bank of the Ibulao River across the Lagawe valley. The name Kiyyangan is enshrined in Ifugao mythology and is believed to be the dwelling of Wigan and Bugan, the mythological ancestors of the Ifugao. It was the former capital of Ifugao until the topology was deemed unfit and moved to neighboring Lagawe.

The Nagacadan Rice Terraces are part of the Rice Terraces of the Philippine Cordilleras World Heritage Site.

Geography

Barangays
Kiangan is politically subdivided into 14 barangays. These barangays are headed by elected officials: Barangay Captain, Barangay Council, whose members are called Barangay Councilors. All are elected every three years.

Ambabag
Baguinge
Bolog
Bokiawan
Dalligan
Duit
Hucab
Julongan
Lingay
Mungayang
Nagacadan
Pindongan
Poblacion
Tuplac

Climate

Demographics

Locally spoken languages include Tuwali, Ayangan, Ilocano, Tagalog, and English.

Economy 

Agriculture and tourism are the main sources of local economic activities which supports commerce and trade among townsfolk. Its terraced rice fields do not only provide produce for the farmers but attract tourists as well.

Government
Kiangan, belonging to the lone congressional district of the province of Ifugao, is governed by a mayor designated as its local chief executive and by a municipal council as its legislative body in accordance with the Local Government Code. The mayor, vice mayor, and the councilors are elected directly by the people through an election which is being held every three years.

Elected officials

Culture

 Nagacadan Rice Terraces
The Nagacadan Rice Terraces is a UNESCO Heritage Site and one of the many rice terraces in the province of Ifugao. The rice terraces cluster manifest a distinct feature - the fields are in ascending rows of terraces bisected by a river.

 Kiangan Shrine
Located in Kiangan is the Kiangan Central School old home economics building, which marks the spot where the highest Commander of the Japanese Imperial Army, General Tomoyuki Yamashita (also known as the Tiger of Malaya), surrendered to the Filipino & American Forces on 2 September 1945.

References

External links

Municipality of Kiangan
 [ Philippine Standard Geographic Code]
Philippine Census Information
Local Governance Performance Management System 

Municipalities of Ifugao